Yaarana or Yaraana may refer to:

 Yaarana, a 1981 Indian musical drama film directed by Rakesh Kumar
 Yaraana, a 1995 Indian romantic thriller film
 Yaarana, a 2015 Indian Punjabi-language film

See also
Yaar? (disambiguation)